Elvis Williams (born April 12, 1981), better known as Blac Elvis, is an American record producer, musician, and songwriter.

Career
He rose to fame in 2005 co-producing alongside Polow da Don, producing hits for Ludacris, Ciara, Kelly Rowland, Fergie, Rich Boy, Kelis, Nelly, Pussycat Dolls, and Mario. He has launched two labels, Black Mud Entertainment and Mars On Sunday Latino. Black Mud represents a new soulful and high-energy sound that Elvis has created and Mars On Sunday Latino represents Latino artists such as La Gente Del Clan.
 
He has produced top-40 hit singles for Fergie ("London Bridge" & "Glamorous"), Ciara ("Promise"), Kelly Rowland ("Like This"), Mario ("Crying Out For Me"), Beyoncé ("Ego") and for Usher ("Lil Freak").

Discography

References

External links
Blac Elvis MySpace page

1981 births
Living people
Musicians from Clarksdale, Mississippi
American hip hop record producers